Percy C Ross (dates of birth and death unknown) was an Irish first-class cricketer.

A leading member of Cork County in the first decade of the 1900s, Ross made his debut for Ireland in a minor match against Cambridge University at Cork in 1904. He later made played one first-class match for Ireland against the touring South Africans at Woodbrook in 1912. Batting twice in the match, Ross top-scored with 26 runs in Ireland's first-innings, before being dismissed by Aubrey Faulkner, while in their second-innings he was dismissed by Claude Carter for 3 runs. With his medium pace bowling, he took the wickets of Herbie Taylor and Frank Mitchell, taking figures of 2/99 from 23 overs. He did not play for Ireland again.

References

External links

Date of birth unknown
Date of death unknown
Irish cricketers